Fangclub is the eponymous debut album by Irish alternative rock band, Fangclub. The album was released on 4 August 2017 through Vertigo Records.

Track listing

Charts

References

External links 
 
 Fangclub at Genius
 

2017 debut albums
Fangclub albums
Vertigo Records albums